Craspedotis diasticha is a moth in the family Gelechiidae. It was first discovered by Turner in 1919. It is found in Australia, New South Wales.

Description 
(For key terms used see Glossary of Entomology Terms)

The wingspan is approximately 13 mm. The forewings are whitish-grey with a broad dark streak in their centre from the base to the apex, giving off a short branch along the fold and a dark terminal line from the apex to a large tornal spot nearly confluent with the centre streak. The hindwings are whitish-grey.

References

Gelechiinae
Moths described in 1919